The 1976 Argentina rugby union tour of Wales and England was a series of six matches played by the Argentina national rugby union team in September and October 1976.

Five of the six matches were played in Wales, including an international match against the Wales national rugby union team. Argentina won the first three matches of the tour but lost the last three. Although Wales did not award caps for the international game they did select a full-strength team and Argentina came close to winning; they led 19–17 as the match went into injury time but were beaten by a late penalty from Phil Bennett. Wales had won the Grand Slam in 1976 and Argentina's performance was considered a shock.

Matches

East Wales: M.Richards; C.F.W.Rees, N.D.Butcher, N.J.Shanklin, N.B.Juliff; G.Lawrence, N.A.Lewis; T.Cobner (capt.), C.Burgess, B.Lease; J.Watkins, J.Floyd; G.Price, R.W.Windsor, A.G.FaulknerArgentina: M.Sansot; D.Beccar Varela, A.Travaglini, A.Rodríguez jurado (capt.) (G.Beccar Varela), J.Gauweloose; H.Porta, A.Etchegaray; J.Carracedo, R.Mastai, C.Neyra; E.Branca, J.J.Fernández; R.Irañeta, J.Costante, M.Carluccio.

 Cardiff R.F.C.: J.Davies; T.G.Davies (capt.), M.Murphy, A.J.Finlayson (Holand), D.Thomas; G.Davies, G.Edwards; S.Lane, B.Dubin-Jones, T.Morgan.I.Robinson, P.Rawlins; M.Knill, M.Watkins, B.Nelmes.Argentina: M.Sansot; D.Beccar Varela, G.Beccar Varela, A.Travaglini, J.Gauweloose, H.Porta, A.Etchegaray (capt.); C.Neyra, R.Mastai, J.Carracedo; E.Branca, J.J.Fernández; F.Insúa, J.Braceras, M.Carluccio (R.Irañeta).

 Aberavon: ' P.Bessant; R.James, A.Rees, I.Halle I.Keene; J.Bevan, C.Shell (capt.); O.Alexander, P.Clarke, R.Davies; P.Bell, W.Mainwaring; C.Williams, W.James, B.Lewis.Argentina: M.Alonso; M.Sansot, A.Travaglini, G.Beccar Varela, G.Álvarez; H.Porta (F.González Victorica), A.Etchegaray (capt.); J.Carracedo; R.Sanz, H.Massini; J.J.Fernández, E.Branca; R.Irañeta, J.Costante, F.Insúa.

North and Midlands Dusty Hare; John Carleton, Paul Dodge, Tony Bond, Mike Slemen; John Horton, Steve Smith; D. Forfar, Tony Neary, Garry Adey; D. Trickey, Bill Beaumont; Fran Cotton (capt.), Peter Wheeler, C. White.Argentina: M.Alonso; M.Sansot, A.Travaglini (capt.), G.Beccar Varela, J.Gauweloose; F.González Victorica, R.Castagna; H.Massini, R.Mastai, C.Neyra; E.Branca, J.J.Fernández; F.Insúa, J.Costante, R.Irañeta.

 West Wales:C.Griffiths; Elgan Rees (L.Thomas), P.Phillips, Roy Bergiers, A.Hill; D.Richards, S.Williams; G.Jones, H.Jenkins, T.Evans; Phil May, Geoff Wheel; P.Llewellyn, R.Thomas, G.Shaw. Argentina: M.Sansot; D.Beccar Varela, A.Travaglini, G.Beccar Varela, J.Gauweloose; H.Porta, A.Etchegaray (capt.); J.Carracedo, J.Sanz, C.Neyra; J.J.Fernández, E.Branca; M.Carluccio, J.Braceras, A.Risler.

Bibliography

References 

1976
1976
1976
rugby
1976–77 in English rugby union
1976–77 in Welsh rugby union
History of rugby union matches between Argentina and Wales
September 1976 sports events in the United Kingdom
October 1976 sports events in the United Kingdom